Westmorland and Lonsdale is a constituency in the south of Cumbria, represented in the House of Commons of the UK Parliament since 2005 by Tim Farron, the former leader of the Liberal Democrats (2015–2017).

Since 2017, Westmorland and Lonsdale has been the only Liberal Democrat seat in the whole of Northern England.

Constituency profile	

The constituency mostly overlaps the South Lakeland district of Cumbria. Important towns by size in the constituency include Kendal, Windermere and Kirkby Lonsdale. It is named for the historic county of Westmorland and the Lancashire Hundred of Lonsdale, both of which extend beyond the bounds of the constituency. This is one of a minority of rural seats where residents voted to Remain in the European Union in 2016.

Boundaries
Following their review of parliamentary representation in Cumbria, the Boundary Commission for England created a modified Westmorland and Lonsdale constituency, to deal with population changes.

The electoral wards used to create the modified seat, contested for the first time at the 2010 general election, are entirely within the South Lakeland district.
Arnside and Beetham, Burneside, Burton and Holme, Cartmel, Coniston, Crooklands, Grange, Hawkshead, Holker, Kendal Castle, Kendal Far Cross, Kendal Fell, Kendal Glebelands, Kendal Heron Hill, Kendal Highgate, Kendal Kirkland, Kendal Mintsfeet, Kendal Nether, Kendal Oxenholme, Kendal Parks, Kendal Stonecross, Kendal Strickland, Kendal Underley, Kirkby Lonsdale, Lakes Ambleside, Lakes Grasmere, Levens, Lyth Valley, Milnthorpe, Natland, Sedbergh, Staveley-in-Cartmel, Staveley-in-Westmorland, Whinfell, Windermere Applethwaite, Windermere Bowness North, Windermere Bowness South and Windermere Town

This removed Broughton-in-Furness from the constituency.

History
Having been a Conservative-dominated seat since its creation in 1983, the 1997 general election saw the Conservatives' majority cut to fewer than 5,000 votes. This was further reduced at the 2001 general election. In 2005, the constituency featured among a list of seats held by high-profile Conservatives (in this case, Shadow Education minister Tim Collins) targeted by the Liberal Democrats by deploying supporters from across each region in what was referred in the media as a "decapitation strategy". In the 2005 election, Tim Farron gained the seat by a marginal majority of 267 votes.

At the 2010 general election, the local electorate caused the largest Conservative-to-Lib Dem swing nationally, of 11.1% — equally the lowest share of the vote for Labour (2.2%, one of five lost deposits for Labour), nationally. With 96.2% of votes cast for either the Conservative or Liberal Democrat candidates, Westmorland and Lonsdale had the highest combined share of the vote cast for the Coalition parties.

Contrasting with its long-term Conservative support, the combined Conservative/UKIP vote narrowly failed to reach 40% in 2015. Equally, Farron, who would become Leader of the Liberal Democrats two months later; was the only member of his party to secure an absolute majority (over 50%) of votes cast, after what was a poor result for the party nationwide with their seat count reduced from 57 seats to 8. In 2017 (when Farron was Lib Dem leader), Farron's majority fell to just 777 votes. However, in 2019, he was re-elected with a majority increased to 1,934.

Members of Parliament

Elections

Elections in the 2010s
In 2019, Westmorland and Lonsdale was one of five English constituencies, the others being Esher and Walton, East Devon, Cheltenham and Winchester, where Labour failed to obtain over 5% of the vote and lost their deposit.

Elections in the 2000s

Elections in the 1990s

Elections in the 1980s

Note: The Robert Gibson who stood in this election and the similarly named candidate in 2001 and 2005 are not the same person.

See also

List of parliamentary constituencies in Cumbria

Notes

References

Politics of Cumbria
Parliamentary constituencies in North West England
Constituencies of the Parliament of the United Kingdom established in 1983
Furness